Olivia Clyne, (née Blatchford; born January 23, 1993 in New York City) is a professional squash player who represents the United States.

Career
Blatchford's junior accomplishments included winning the British Junior Open Girls under-15 event in 2007. She competed in the 2015 Pan American Games in Toronto, Canada, representing the U.S.A. She brought back a silver medal from the individual event, and a gold medal from the teams event, with American compatriots Amanda Sobhy and Natalie Grainger.

She reached a career-high world ranking of World No. 11 in October 2021. She won the U.S. National Championship twice in 2017 and 2019.

In 2022, she was part of the United States team that reached the final of the 2022 Women's World Team Squash Championships. It was the first time that the United States had reached the final.

Personal life
In 2018, Blatchford married Alan Clyne, a fellow professional squash player.

References

External links

1993 births
Living people
American female squash players
Sportspeople from Brooklyn
Squash players at the 2011 Pan American Games
Squash players at the 2015 Pan American Games
Pan American Games medalists in squash
Pan American Games bronze medalists for the United States
Squash players at the 2019 Pan American Games
Medalists at the 2011 Pan American Games
Medalists at the 2015 Pan American Games
Medalists at the 2019 Pan American Games
21st-century American women